American Standard may refer to:

Brands and companies
 American Standard Companies, a former global manufacturer, predecessor of Trane
 American Standard Insurance Company, a subsidiary of American Family Insurance
 American Standard, a brand of plumbing fixtures made by American Standard Brands
 American Standard, a brand of HVAC equipment made by Trane
 American Standard, a line of guitars made by Fender Musical Instruments Corporation

Music
 American Standard (Seven Mary Three album), 1995
 American Standards (band), an American hardcore punk band from Phoenix, Arizona
 American Standard (Adams), an early composition by John Adams
 American Standard (James Taylor album), 2020

Other
 American Standard Version (ASV), of the Bible
 American Standard of Perfection, North American poultry breed standard
 American Standard Building, New York City landmark skyscraper formerly called the American Radiator Building
 American Standard Code for Information Interchange, abbreviated ASCII
 American Standard thread, another name for United States Standard thread

See also
 The Standard (disambiguation)